Will Schusterick (born May 4, 1992 in Reno, Nevada) is an American professional disc golfer.

Schusterick has won the United States Disc Golf Championship three times. He turned pro in 2008 at the age of 16, and his career earnings are $215,190.29 (as of September 2016).

Schusterick was born in Nevada, but has lived the majority of his life in Knoxville and Nashville, Tennessee. He is currently sponsored by, and a part-owner of Prodigy Disc.

Professional career

Notable wins

Major, NT playoff record (2-1)

Summary

Annual statistics

†At Year End

Equipment
Schusterick is sponsored by Prodigy Disc. He commonly carries a combination of the following discs:

Distance Drivers
D1 (400g, 400s)
D2 (400g)
D3 (400g)
D4 (400g)
X1 (750)

Fairway Drivers
H1 (750)
H3 (750)
F1 (400)
F2 (400)
F3 (400s)
F5 (400)

Midranges
A2 (400g)
M2 (200, 750)
M3 (750)

Putters
PA1 (300s, 750)
PA3 (200, 300s, 350g)
PA4 (200)

References

American disc golfers
Living people
1992 births
Sportspeople from Reno, Nevada